Pyrophosphoric acid, also known as diphosphoric acid, is the inorganic compound with the formula H4P2O7 or, more descriptively, [(HO)2P(O)]2O. Colorless and odorless, it is soluble in water, diethyl ether, and ethyl alcohol. The anhydrous acid crystallizes in two polymorphs, which melt at 54.3 and 71.5 °C. The compound is a component of polyphosphoric acid, an important source of phosphoric acid.  Anions, salts, and esters of pyrophosphoric acid are called pyrophosphates.

Preparation
It can be prepared by reaction of phosphoric acid with phosphoryl chloride:
  →  
It can also be prepared by ion exchange from sodium pyrophosphate or by treating lead pyrophosphate with hydrogen sulfide.

Boiling the water from orthophosphoric acid will not dehydrate it to pure pyrophosphoric acid, instead a mixture of ortho, pyro, and polyphosphoric acids are produced, the maximum pyrophosphoric acid concentration remains below 50% and occurs slightly before what would otherwise be pure pyrophosphoric acid.

Reactions
Pyrophosphoric acid is a tetraprotic acid, with four distinct pKa's:
, pKa = 0.85
, pKa = 1.96 
, pKa = 6.60
, pKa = 9.41 
The pKa's occur in two distinct ranges because deprotonations occur on separate phosphate groups.  For comparison with the pKa's for phosphoric acid are 2.14, 7.20, and 12.37.

At physiological pH's, pyrophosphate exists as a mixture of doubly and singly protonated forms.

When molten, pyrophosphoric acid rapidly converts to an equilibrium mixture of phosphoric acid, pyrophosphoric acid and polyphosphoric acids. The percentage by weight of pyrophosphoric acid is around 40% and it is difficult to recrystallise from the melt. 

Even in cold water, pyrophosphoric acid hydrolyses to phosphoric acid.  All polyphosphoric acids behave similarly.

Safety
While pyrophosphoric acid is corrosive, it is not known to be otherwise toxic.

History
The name pyrophosphoric acid was given by a "Mr. Clarke of Glasgow" in 1827 who is credited with its discovery following the heating to red heat of a sodium phosphate salt. It was found that phosphoric acid when heated to red heat formed pyrophosphoric acid that was readily converted to phosphoric acid by hot water.

See also

 Disulfuric acid

 Sodium pyrophosphate
 Calcium pyrophosphate dihydrate deposition disease
 Dimethylallyl pyrophosphate
 ADP
 ATP
 Ortho acids
 triphosphoric acid

References

External links
Pyrophosphoric acid at PubChem

Hydrogen compounds
Pyrophosphates
Phosphorus oxoacids
Acid anhydrides
Phosphorus(V) compounds